Refsum disease  is an autosomal recessive neurological disease that results in the over-accumulation of phytanic acid in cells and tissues. It is one of several disorders named after Norwegian neurologist Sigvald Bernhard Refsum (1907–1991). Refsum disease typically is adolescent onset and is diagnosed by above average levels of phytanic acid. Humans obtain the necessary phytanic acid primarily through diet. It is still unclear what function phytanic acid plays physiologically in humans, but has been found to regulate fatty acid metabolism in the liver of mice.

Presentation
Individuals with Refsum disease present with neurologic damage, cerebellar degeneration, and peripheral neuropathy. Onset is most commonly in childhood/adolescence with a progressive course, although periods of stagnation or remission occur. Symptoms also include ataxia, scaly skin (ichthyosis), difficulty hearing, and eye problems including retinitis pigmentosa, cataracts, and night blindness. In 80% of patients diagnosed with Refsum disease, sensorineural hearing loss has been reported. This is hearing loss as the result of damage to the inner ear or the nerve connectIng ear to the brain.

Cause
Refsum disease is a peroxisomal disorder caused by the impaired alpha-oxidation of branched chain fatty acids resulting in buildup of phytanic acid and its derivatives in the plasma and tissues. This may be due to deficiencies of phytanoyl-CoA hydroxylase or peroxin-7 activity. In general, Refsum disease is caused by PHYH mutations.

PEX7 gene mutations can interrupt the peroxisomal transport of proteins as this gene codes for the peroxin 7 protein receptor. These mutations in the PEX7 gene generally lead to rhizomelic chondrodysplasia punctata type 1- which impairs development of many parts of the body. Refsum disease is inherited in an autosomal recessive pattern, meaning that it requires both copies of the mutation to inherit the disease.

Diagnosis
Histopathologic examination of the skin from a suspected patient commonly shows hyperkeratosis, hyper-granulosis and acanthosis. The presence of cells in the basal and suprabasal layers of the epidermis containing variably sized vacuoles with accumulated lipids is pathognomonic for the disease.

Classification
Adult Refsum disease may be divided into the adult Refsum disease 1 and adult Refsum disease 2 subtypes. The former stems from mutations in the phytanoyl-CoA hydroxylase (PAHX aka PHYH) gene, on the PHYH locus at 10p13 on chromosome 6q22-24. It was initially believed this was the sole mutation; however 55% of cases are now attributed to mutations in other genes.

Refsum disease 2 stems from mutations in the peroxin 7 (PEX7) gene. This mutation on the PEX7 gene is also on chromosome 6q22-24, and was found in patients presenting with accumulation of phytanic acid with no PHYH mutation.

Adult Refsum disease should not be confused with infantile Refsum disease, a peroxisome biogenesis disorder resulting from deficiencies in the catabolism of very long chain fatty acids and branched chain fatty acids (such as phytanic acid) and plasmalogen biosynthesis.

Treatment
Since phytanic acid is not endogenously produced in the human body, individuals with Refsum disease are commonly placed on a phytanic acid-restricted diet and avoid the consumption of fats from ruminant animals and certain fish, such as tuna, cod, and haddock. Grass feeding animals and their milk are also avoided. Recent research has shown that CYP4 isoform enzymes could help reduce the over-accumulation of phytanic acid in vivo. Plasmapheresis is another medical intervention used to treat patients. This involves the filtering of blood to ensure there is no accumulation of phytanic acid.

Biological sources of phytanic acid
In ruminant animals, the gut fermentation of consumed plant materials liberates phytol, a constituent of chlorophyll, which is then converted to phytanic acid and stored in fats. Although humans cannot derive significant amounts of phytanic acid from the consumption of chlorophyll present in plant materials, it has been proposed that the great apes (chimpanzees, gorillas and orangutans) as well as other captive non-human primates can derive significant amounts of phytanic acid from the hindgut fermentation of plant materials.

See also
 Global DARE Foundation (Patient Advocacy Group for Refsum Disease)
 The Myelin Project
 List of cutaneous conditions

References

External links 

 

Peroxisomal disorders
Autosomal recessive disorders
Fatty-acid metabolism disorders
Genodermatoses
Neurodegenerative disorders
Rare diseases